The 2019 World RX of Canada was the seventh round and final race before the summer break of the sixth season of the FIA World Rallycross Championship. The event was held at the Circuit Trois-Rivières in Trois-Rivières, Quebec.

Supercar 

Source

Heats

Semi-finals 

 Semi-Final 1

 Semi-Final 2

Final

Standings after the event 

Source

 Note: Only the top six positions are included.

References 

|- style="text-align:center"
|width="35%"|Previous race:2019 World RX of Sweden
|width="40%"|FIA World Rallycross Championship2019 season
|width="35%"|Next race:2019 World RX of France
|- style="text-align:center"
|width="35%"|Previous race:2018 World RX of Canada
|width="40%"|World RX of Canada
|width="35%"|Next race:none
|- style="text-align:center"

Canada
World RX
World RX